Georgi Tonkov (born 5 April 1975) is a Bulgarian judoka.

Achievements

Mixed martial arts record

|-
| Win
| align=center| 1-1
| Jake Bramstone
| Decision (Split)
| Fighting Spirit 22
| 
| align=center| 3
| align=center| 5:00
| 
| 
|-
| Loss
| align=center| 0-1
| Lee Hasdell
| KO (Flying Knee)
| Rings: World Title Series 4
| 
| align=center| 1
| align=center| 4:42
| Tokyo, Japan
|

References
 
 MMA Record

1975 births
Living people
Bulgarian sambo practitioners
Bulgarian male judoka
Bulgarian male mixed martial artists
Mixed martial artists utilizing judo
Mixed martial artists utilizing sambo